Justin Chadwick (born 6 December 1968) is an English actor and television and film director. He directed episodes of EastEnders, Byker Grove, The Bill, Spooks and Red Cap before directing nine of the fifteen episodes of the mini-series Bleak House, which was broadcast by the BBC in the UK and by PBS in the United States as part of its Masterpiece Theatre series.

Chadwick was nominated for the Primetime Emmy Award for Outstanding Directing for a Miniseries, Movie or Dramatic Special, the Royal Television Society Award for Breakout Performance Behind the Scenes and the BAFTA Award for Best Direction for Bleak House, which was the Best Drama Serial winner in the British Academy Television Awards 2006.

Life and career
Chadwick was born in Salford, Lancashire. He began acting at the age of eleven.

He joined Bolton Little Theatre and played Billy Casper in Kes. He attended Turton High School in Bolton, before graduating from Leicester Polytechnic and in 1991 made his screen debut in London Kills Me. Other acting credits include The Loss of Sexual Innocence and appearances in the television dramas Heartbeat, Dangerfield, Dalziel and Pascoe and others.

Chadwick's  directorial debut was the 1993 television film Family Style starring Ewan McGregor, after which he directed and performed in Shakespeare Shorts, a series that explored the history of Shakespearean characters and presented them in key scenes from the plays in which they appeared. He directed episodes of EastEnders, Byker Grove, The Bill, Spooks, Life Force and Red Cap before directing nine of the fifteen episodes of the mini-series Bleak House, which was broadcast by the BBC in the UK and by PBS in the United States as part of its Masterpiece Theatre series.

Chadwick was nominated for the Primetime Emmy Award for Outstanding Directing for a Miniseries, Movie or Dramatic Special, the Royal Television Society Award for Breakout Performance Behind the Scenes and the BAFTA Award for Best Direction for Bleak House, which was the Best Drama Serial winner in the British Academy Television Awards 2006. Bleak House was also nominated for two Golden Globes, four Royal Television Society Awards, three Broadcasting Press Guild Awards, three Satellite Awards, and the Television Critics Award.

Chadwick was the director of The Other Boleyn Girl, which was shown at the February 2008 Berlin International Film Festival. He worked on screen adaptations of Birdsong (released 2012) and Jamaica Inn in 2008. He completed the feature film The First Grader, which was released on 13 May 2010.

Filmography
 London Kills Me (1991)
 The Other Boleyn Girl (2008)
 The First Grader (2010)
 Mandela: Long Walk to Freedom (2013)
 Tulip Fever (2017)

References

External links
 

1968 births
Living people
Alumni of the University of Leicester
English male film actors
English male television actors
English television directors
English film directors
Male actors from Salford
20th-century English male actors
21st-century English male actors